The 2017 BBL-Pokal was the 50th season of the German Basketball Cup. The Final Four was held in Berlin, which gained Alba Berlin automatic qualification. The other six participating teams were selected through the standings in the 2016–17 Basketball Bundesliga.

Participants
The following six teams qualified based on their standings in the first half of the 2016–17 BBL. Alba Berlin qualified directly as host of the tournament.

Bracket

Qualifying round
The draw was held on 30 December 2016.

Top Four
The draw was held on 22 January 2017.

Semifinals

Third place game

Final

References

External links
Official website

BBL-Pokal seasons
BBL-Pokal